Stapleton is a village in the Selby district of North Yorkshire, England. The population taken at the 2011 Census was less than 100. Details are included in the civil parish of Womersley.

Stapleton is home to the Stapleton Colony of the Brotherhood Church.

References 

Villages in North Yorkshire
Selby District